The 2014 Mountain West Conference men's basketball tournament was held on March 12–15, 2014 at the Thomas & Mack Center in Las Vegas, Nevada. With San Jose State and Utah State added to the MWC, the MWC had an 11-team tournament for 2014. The top five seeds got a first round bye. For the second year in a row, the first-round games were online, quarterfinals and semifinals games were on the CBS Sports Network and the championship game was televised on CBS. The tournament champion received the Mountain West's automatic bid to the 2014 NCAA tournament.

Seeds
Teams were seeded by conference record, with a ties broken by record between the tied teams followed by record against the regular-season champion, if necessary. The top five seeds received first round byes.

Schedule

Bracket

References

Mountain West Conference men's basketball tournament
Tournament
Mountain West Conference men's basketball tournament
Mountain West Conference men's basketball tournament